The following highways are numbered 176:

Canada
 New Brunswick Route 176
 Prince Edward Island Route 176

Costa Rica
 National Route 176

Japan
 Japan National Route 176

United States
 Interstate 176
 U.S. Route 176
 Alabama State Route 176
 Arizona State Route 176 (former)
 Arkansas Highway 176
 Arkansas Highway 176Y
 California State Route 176 (former)
 Connecticut Route 176
 Georgia State Route 176 (former)
 Illinois Route 176
 K-176 (Kansas highway) (former)
Kentucky Route 176
 Louisiana Highway 176
 Maine State Route 176
 Maryland Route 176
 M-176 (Michigan highway) (former)
 Missouri Route 176
 New Mexico State Road 176
 New York State Route 176
 Ohio State Route 176
 Pennsylvania Route 176 (former)
 Tennessee State Route 176
 Texas State Highway 176
 Texas State Highway Spur 176
 Utah State Route 176
 Utah State Route 176 (1935–1969)
 Virginia State Route 176
 Wisconsin Highway 176 (former)
Territories:
 Puerto Rico Highway 176